Saadi Town is a residential neighborhood of Malir Cantt in City, Sindh, Pakistan. The developer of the Saadi Town is Pakland Housing Projects. Saadi Town is located on the Eastern region of the city, and has experienced rapid population growth during last five years. The location, however, is a low-lying area and used to have flooding conditions before, but now, the problem has been solved. Saadi Town is few minutes drive from the M-9 motorway.

Saadi Shirazi 
Saadi Town is named after the famous Persian poet Saadi Shirazi who wrote Bostan and Gulistan.

Layout

Suburb 
The suburb residents have always enjoyed calm and secure environment, distant from the hustle bustle of the urban center; With all the basic necessities and amenities, including a hospital with Community Center, secondary and high schools, officer's mess, guest hotel, playground, and soccer stadiums, parks, protected forests, multiple markets, Largest Hub of Real Estate Agents in scheme 33, weekly bazaars and briefly a discounted mart.

Demography 
There are several ethnic groups in Saadi Town including [Muhajir people], Punjabis, Kashmiris  Pakhtuns, Baloches, Memons, Bohras and Ismailis.

Saadi Town total have 7 Blocks, Block-1, Block-2, Block-3, Block-4, Block-5, Block-6 & Block-7. 
Largest mosque of Saadi Town is Jamia Masjid Umer.
Six Bank available for peoples.
4 Super Mini Mart in Saadi Town.
120 Sq Yards, 240 Sq Yards, 400 Sq Yards are Residential Plots available in Saadi Town.
80 Sq Yards Plots are only available for Commercial category in Saadi Town.

See also
 Saadi Garden
Gadap Town
Malir Cantonment
 Gulshan-e-Osman

References

External links 
 Official Karachi Website
 Government of Sindh
 Board of Secondary Education Karachi
 Board of Intermediate Education

Neighbourhoods of Karachi